The Staten Island Advance is a daily newspaper published in the borough of Staten Island in New York City. The only daily newspaper published in the borough, and the only major daily paper focused on a borough, it covers news of local and community interest, including borough politics. As of April 25, 2007, Monday–Friday circulation was down 3.9% from the previous year, to 59,461. Sunday dropped 4.6% to 73,203.  It is the namesake and nominal flagship publication of Advance Publications.

History

The Advance was created in 1886  by printer John J. Crawford and businessman James C. Kennedy as the Richmond County Advance. The name was changed to the Daily Advance before it was changed to its current name. When the Advance began, there were nine competing daily newspapers in Staten Island. The circulation of the Advance surpassed these early competitors. Its circulation grew from 4,500 in 1910 to over 80,000 by the mid 1990s.

In 1908, Samuel Irving Newhouse Sr. started working for New Jersey Democratic machine politician, Bayonne Times newspaper owner, and Judge Hyman Lazarus's law office as an office-boy, bookkeeper and rent-collector. By the time Samuel Newhouse Sr. was 21 in 1916, his boss Lazarus rewarded him with a salary of around $30,000 per year, and 25 percent ownership of the Bayonne Times, for loyal service.

Newhouse purchased the Staten Island Advance with Lazarus in 1922. This was one of the first newspapers he acquired. When Lazarus died in 1924, Newhouse bought his family's share of Staten Island Advance stock.

During the 1920s, the Newhouse family loaned money to Henry Garfinkle, which enabled him to open newsstands that increased sales of the Newhouse family's Staten Island Advance at the St. George Ferry Terminal on Staten Island, and later opened newsstands throughout Manhattan, as well as LaGuardia Airport, Newark Airport, and the Port Authority Bus Terminal (the world's largest and most lucrative newsstand).

Even during the Great Depression in the 1930s, the Newhouse family had enough money to buy the Long Island Press in Jamaica and competitors Long Island Star, North Shore Journal and Nassau Journal, as well as the Newark Ledger, the Newark Star and newspapers in Syracuse. The Newhouse family paid its non-unionized newsroom employees at the Long Island Press one third less than the unionized New York Times and New York Daily News paid its reporters for similar work in the 1930s. Newhouse paid himself a salary greater than the total of all the salaries paid to the 65 newsroom employees there.

The Newhouse family purchased newspapers in Syracuse, Jersey City and Harrisburg in the 1940s, and in St. Louis, Oregon and Alabama in the 1950s. Some began to wonder how the Newhouse family obtained so much money. The Newhouse family's wealth approached $200 million in the late 1950s, enabling it to purchase Vogue and other Conde Nast magazines. Author Richard Meeker describes the mounting suspicions about the Newhouse family's source of wealth in Newspaperman: S.I. Newhouse and the Business Of News:

Newspaper analysts were so suspicious of the source of Newhouse's funds that they discussed openly the possibility that he was laundering money...Some went so far as to suggest that his newspaper operations had been used as a front for the notorious Reinfeld mob, a group of booze-peddling hoodlums whose boss had made millions during prohibition.

One way the Newhouse family apparently was able to accumulate so much money so rapidly during the 20th century was by hiring accountants and lawyers who figured out unique ways for the Newhouse dynasty to avoid paying a fair share of taxes on their rapidly growing family wealth. As Newspaperman reported:

"They played every tax game there was", recalled one man who once served as publisher for several Newhouse newspapers.  That meant that every cost that could conceivably be written off as a business deduction was, that assets were depreciated as rapidly as possible, and that new acquisitions were "written up" as high as the law allowed ... Where Newhouse developed a special advantage was in the way he avoided paying taxes for the profits that remained to him after the payment of corporate taxes ...<p>Thanks to an ingenious device created by his accountant, Louis Glickman, and implemented by his attorney, Charles Goldman, Newhouse was able to avoid paying taxes on accumulated earnings and, thus, to multiply the value of his earnings several times.  Doing so involved the creation of a special corporate structure for the various newspapers ... Because the Goldman–Glickman construct kept the various enterprises separate—for tax purposes at least—each could claim the right to its own surplus.  Taken together, the accumulation that resulted was many times what the IRS would have allowed had Newhouse simply treated all of his operations as a single corporation.

Meeker characterized the Samuel I. Newhouse Foundation as "a charity his Samuel Irving Newhouse Sr.'s lawyers had created as an additional tax dodge", and charged that Newhouse Foundation funds were used by the Newhouse family to finance its $18 million purchase of Alabama's Birmingham News in 1955.

After Samuel Newhouse Sr. died in 1979, his two sons, Samuel Irving Newhouse Jr. and Donald Newhouse, were accused of tax evasion by the IRS in 1983. While the IRS dropped tax fraud charges against them in the 1980s, it increased the Newhouse family tax delinquency bill to $1.2 billion, asserting that the Newhouse estate was actually worth $2.2 billion—not $1.2 billion—when Samuel Newhouse Sr. died in 1979, according to the March 13, 1989, issue of The Nation.

One year after Newhouse's death in 1979, the Advance Group purchased Random House, but sold it to Bertelsmann in 1998.

The original office of the Staten Island Advance was located on Castleton Avenue in the West Brighton neighborhood. In 1960, the paper moved to the current office on West Fingerboard Road in Grasmere.  For many years, this office also doubled as the nominal headquarters for Advance Publications; the company did not have a formal headquarters for much of its history.

Writers
 Giavanni Alves
 Erik Bascome
 Kristin Dalton
 Charlie De Biase Jr.
 Maura Grunlund
 Annalise Knudson
 Kyle Lawson
 Paul Liotta
 Shaina McLawrence
 Joseph Ostapiuk
 Tracey Porpora
 Jason Paderon
 Nicholas Regina
 Priya Shahi
 Mark Stein
 Tom Wrobleski

See also
 Media of New York City

References

External links
SILive.com (Advance news portal)
Published articles of former FL!P writer, Brandon S. Touhey

Daily newspapers published in New York City
Staten Island
Publications established in 1886
Advance Publications
1886 establishments in New York (state)
New York City local newspapers, in print